Triple A is a Trance music group made up of Armin van Buuren, Alex M.O.R.P.H. and Ana Criado, explaining the Triple A.

Their first track "Winter Stayed" was first featured on A State of Trance in 2011 and later released as an EP.

Trance music groups